This is a list of the members of the Lower Saxon Landtag in the period 2003 to 2008. This is the fifteenth period. The members were elected in the election of 2 February 2003.

Overview

A total of 183 representatives were elected, distributed as follows:
63 to the Social Democratic Party (Sozialdemokratische Partei Deutschlands)
14 to the Alliance '90/The Greens (Bündnis 90/Die Grünen)
91 to the Christian Democratic Union (Christlich Demokratische Union Deutschlands)
15 to the Free Democratic Party (Freie Demokratische Partei)

Out of these representatives, the first cabinet Wulff was formed.

List of representatives

References
Lower Saxon Landtag official site